The Sopot Lighthouse is a navigation facility on the Polish Baltic coast, located in Sopot. It was built in 1903–04 as a part of the Balneological Institute. It is open to visitors.

See also 

 List of lighthouses in Poland

References

External links 
 The Lighthouses of Poland
 Urząd Morski w Słupsku  
 Latarnia morska (Sopot) na portalu polska-org.pl  

Lighthouses completed in 1904
Resort architecture in Pomerania
Lighthouses in Poland
Buildings and structures in Sopot
Tourist attractions in Pomeranian Voivodeship